Lee A. Donaldson, Jr. (August 11, 1925 – September 3, 2009) was a former Republican member of the Pennsylvania House of Representatives.

He died aboard a cruise ship departing St. Petersburg, Russia to Helsinki, Finland of a heart attack in 2009.

References

Republican Party members of the Pennsylvania House of Representatives
1925 births
2009 deaths
People from Etna, Pennsylvania
20th-century American politicians